Protogygia enalaga is a species of cutworm or dart moth in the family Noctuidae. It is found in North America.

The MONA or Hodges number for Protogygia enalaga is 10893.

References

Further reading

 
 
 

Noctuinae
Articles created by Qbugbot
Moths described in 1932